The following is a list of notable deaths in November 2015.

Entries for each day are listed alphabetically by surname. A typical entry lists information in the following sequence:
Name, age, country of citizenship and reason for notability, established cause of death, reference.

November 2015

1
Abdikarim Yusuf Adam, Somali military officer, Chief of Army (2015), shot.
Bill Ballantine, 78, British-born New Zealand marine biologist.
Ronald Desruelles, 60, Belgian Olympic athlete (1976, 1984), suicide by hanging.
Thomas R. Fitzgerald, 74, American judge, Chief Justice (2008–2010) and member (2000–2010) of the Illinois Supreme Court, Parkinson's disease.
José Fonseca e Costa, 82, Portuguese film director (No Trace of Sin), pneumonia.
Anselmo Gouthier, 82, Italian politician, MEP (1979–1984).
Gloria Salguero Gross, 74, Salvadoran politician, President of the Legislative Assembly (1994–1997), cardiac arrest.
Stephen Hancock, 89, English actor (Coronation Street).
*Afzal Khan Lala, 89, Pakistani politician, MP for Swat (1993–1997), complications from cirrhosis.
Houston McTear, 58, American sprinter, lung cancer.
Charles Duncan Michener, 97, American entomologist.
Paolo Poiret, 70, Italian actor and voice actor.
Günter Schabowski, 86, German politician, editor-in-chief of Neues Deutschland, First Secretary of the East Berlin SED, prematurely announced the fall of the Berlin Wall.
Hayden Shell, 78, Australian politician, member of the Victorian Legislative Assembly for Geelong West (1982–85) and Geelong (1985–92).
Rudolf Scheurer, 90, Swiss football referee.
Fred Thompson, 73, American politician and actor (Law & Order, Sinister, Cape Fear), U.S. Senator from Tennessee (1994–2003), minority counsel to the Senate Watergate Committee, lymphoma.
A. Veluppillai, 78, Sri Lankan Tamil academic and author.

2
Frank Budgen, 61, British commercial director (Tag, Mountain), cancer.
Andrzej Ciechanowiecki, 91, Polish art historian.
Mike Davies, 79, Welsh tennis player, mesothelioma.
Roy Dommett, 82, British engineer and rocket scientist.
Peter Donaldson, 70, Egyptian-born British newsreader and radio broadcaster (BBC Radio 4), cancer.
Christopher Duggan, 57, British historian, suicide by hanging.
Betty Fountain, 85, American baseball player (AAGPBL).
Hashim Abdul Halim, 80, Indian politician, West Bengal MLA for Amdanga (1977–2006) and Entally (2006–2011), heart attack.
Omar El-Hariri, c. 71, Libyan general, traffic collision.
Karl Jaeger, 85, American educator, writer and artist.
Haruko Kato, 92, Japanese actress (Howl's Moving Castle, Kiki's Delivery Service).
Alexey Kozlov, 80, Russian Soviet intelligence officer, Hero of the Russian Federation.
Neville Lakay, 77, South African cricketer.
Eddie Milner, 60, American baseball player (Cincinnati Reds, San Francisco Giants).
Tommy Overstreet, 78, American country singer.
Roméo Phillion, 76, Canadian prisoner, wrongly convicted of murder, COPD.
Miroslav Poljak, 71, Croatian water polo player, Olympic champion (1968).
Kondavalasa Lakshmana Rao, 69, Indian actor, brain infection.
Arthur Shaw, 91, English footballer (Arsenal).
Donald Shell, 91, American computer scientist (Shellsort).
Barbara Snelling, 87, American politician, Vermont Lieutenant Governor (1993–1997), State Senator (1999–2002), and First Lady (1977–1985 and 1991).
Edward Soja, 75, American geographer.
David Stock, 76, American composer and conductor, blood disease.
Tan Kim Bee, 86, Malaysian Olympic weightlifter.
Carlos Vargas Ferrer, 44, Puerto Rican politician, member of the P.R. House of Representatives, traffic collision following a heart attack.
Colin Welland, 81, British actor and screenwriter (Kes, Straw Dogs, Chariots of Fire), Oscar winner (1982).

3
Peter Bayley, 94, English academic.
Adriana Campos, 36, Colombian actress (Vecinos), traffic collision.
Judy Cassab, 95, Austrian-born Australian painter and Holocaust survivor, only woman to win two Archibald Prizes (1960, 1967).
Ahmed Chalabi, 70, Iraqi politician, Deputy Prime Minister (2005–2006), President of the Governing Council (2003), Iraq War lobbyist, heart attack.
Csaba Fenyvesi, 72, Hungarian fencer, Olympic champion (1968, 1972), cancer.
David Graham, 91, American casting director (Three's Company, Purple Rain).
Tom Graveney, 88, English cricketer (Gloucestershire, Worcestershire, England), Parkinson's disease.
Paul Gundani, 49, Zimbabwean footballer (national team), suspected malaria.
Chuck Hurston, 72, American football player (Kansas City Chiefs, Buffalo Bills), cancer.
Sidney H. Lazard, 84, American bridge player.
S. Mahalingam, 89, Sri Lankan mechanical engineer and academic.
Fred McNeill, 63, American football player (Minnesota Vikings), complications from amyotrophic lateral sclerosis.
Beggzadi Mahmuda Nasir, 86, Bangladeshi academic.
Lauretta Ngcobo, 84, South African author and activist.
Nils Nygaard, 83, Norwegian professor of law.
Dan Poynter, 78, American author, publisher, pioneer in self-publishing, acute myeloid leukemia and renal failure.
Paul Rose, 79, British politician, MP for Manchester Blackley (1964–1979).
Fred J. Scollay, 92, American actor (Law & Order, Death Wish).
Rick Sortun, 73, American football player (St. Louis Cardinals).
Katherine Stenholm, 98, American film director.
Lesley Vance, 76, American politician, member of the Alabama House of Representatives (since 1994), colon cancer.

4
Gülten Akın, 82, Turkish poet.
Ingo von Bredow, 75, German sailor, Olympic bronze medalist (1960).
Desmond Bull, 80, Australian cricketer.
Piotr Domaradzki, 69, Polish-born American journalist (Dziennik Związkowy), essayist and historian, smoke inhalation.
Ron Drzewiecki, 82, American football player (Chicago Bears).
René Girard, 91, French-American historian, literary critic, and philosopher of social science.
Ian Greer, 82, British political lobbyist (Cash-for-questions affair).
Steve Hanson, 54, Australian rugby league player (North Sydney, Eastern Suburbs, New South Wales), heart attack.
Veikko Heinonen, 81, Finnish ski jumper.
Truman McGill Hobbs, 94, American judge, District Court for the Middle District of Alabama (1980–1991).
Károly Horváth, 65, Romanian–Hungarian composer and musician.
Ole Knapp, 83, Norwegian politician.
Themba Makhanya, 45, Swazi Olympic athlete.
Melissa Mathison, 65, American screenwriter (E.T. the Extra-Terrestrial, The Black Stallion, Kundun), neuroendocrine cancer.
Marina Pankova, 52, Russian volleyball player, Olympic champion (1988).
Laila Pullinen, 82, Finnish sculptor.
Lee Robinson, 72, American politician, member of the Georgia Senate (1974–1982), Mayor of Macon (1987–1991), colon cancer.
Jerzy Sadek, 73, Polish footballer (Sparta Rotterdam, national team).
David Teeuwen, 45, American newspaper editor (USA Today), intestinal cancer.
Kostas Tsakonas, 72, Greek actor, cancer.

5
James Achurch, 87, Australian Olympic javelin thrower (1956).
George Barris, 89, American custom car designer (Batmobile, Munster Koach), cancer.
Ritch Brinkley, 71, American actor (Murphy Brown, Cabin Boy, Beauty and the Beast).
Nora Brockstedt, 92, Norwegian singer.
Soma Edirisinghe, 76, Sri Lankan executive, film producer, philanthropist and social worker.
Pierre Gy, 91, French chemist and statistician.
Ehud Havazelet, 60, American author.
Theodore Cyrus Karp, 89, American musicologist.
Czesław Kiszczak, 90, Polish soldier and politician, last Prime Minister of the People's Republic of Poland (1989) and Minister of Internal Affairs (1981–1990).
Ed Lechner, 95, American football player (New York Giants).
Mikhail Lesin, 57, Russian political advisor and media executive (Gazprom-Media), creator of Russia Today, blunt force head trauma.
Hans Mommsen, 85, German historian of Nazism and the Holocaust.
Lar O'Byrne, 91, Irish footballer (Shamrock Rovers).
Kjell Öhman, 72, Swedish musician.

6
Brian Cadle, 67, Canadian ice hockey player (Winnipeg Jets), brain cancer.
Bobby Campbell, 78, British football player and manager.
Gimme Da Lute, 3, American racehorse, euthanized.
José Ángel Espinoza, 96, Mexican singer, composer and actor.
Karel Mejta, 87, Czech rower, Olympic champion (1952).
John Pashley, 82, Australian rugby union player (national team).
Chuck Pyle, 70, American country-folk singer-songwriter, drowned.
*Ri Ul-sol, 94, North Korean politician and military official, lung cancer. 
Yveta Synek Graff, 81, Czech opera singer and vocal coach.
Beni Veras, 80, Brazilian politician, Governor of Ceará (2002–2003).

7
Bappaditya Bandopadhyay, 45, Indian director and poet, heart attack.
Fred Besana, 85, American baseball player (Baltimore Orioles).
Ken Booth, 84, English footballer.
John Davis, 72, Australian science documentary filmmaker (ABC) and climber, first person to scale Ball's Pyramid, helicopter crash.
Carl-Åke Eriksson, 80, Swedish actor (Frostbite, The Girl Who Kicked the Hornets' Nest, The Simple-Minded Murderer), cancer.
Gladys-Marie Fry, 84, American folklorist and historian, heart attack.
Pancho Guedes, 90, Portuguese architect and artist.
Gunnar Hansen, 68, Icelandic-born American actor (The Texas Chain Saw Massacre), pancreatic cancer.
Eddie Hoh, 71, American rock drummer (The Mamas & the Papas, The Monkees, Donovan).
Yitzhak Navon, 94, Israeli politician, President (1978–1983).
David Shawcross, 74, English footballer (Manchester City, Stockport, Halifax).
Vincent Thomas, 93, American politician, Mayor of Norfolk, Virginia (1976–1984).
João Verle, 75, Brazilian politician, Mayor of Porto Alegre (2002–2004).
Carl L. Weschcke, 85, American publisher (Llewellyn Worldwide).

8
Abd Al-Karim Al-Iryani, 81, Yemeni politician, Prime Minister (1998–2001).
Rhea Chiles, 84, American philanthropist, First Lady of Florida (1991–1998), founder of Florida House on Capitol Hill and the Polk Museum of Art.
Harry Clarke, 94, English footballer (Darlington) and cricketer.
Joseph Cure, 31, American ice hockey player and actor (Miracle), traffic collision.
Rod Davies, 85, British astronomer, cancer.
Charlie Dick, 81, American record promoter.
Andrei Eshpai, 90, Russian classical pianist, composer and scholar, stroke.
Luciano Gallino, 88, Italian sociologist.
Betty Groff, 80, American chef and cookbook author, expert on the Pennsylvania Dutch cuisine.
Aldo Guidolin, 83, Canadian ice hockey player (New York Rangers).
Om Prakash Mehra, 96, Indian military officer, Chief of Air Staff (1973–1976), Governor of Maharashtra (1980–1982) and Rajasthan (1985–1987).
Angad Paul, 45, British manufacturing executive and film producer (Lock, Stock and Two Smoking Barrels, Snatch, The Tournament), suicide by jumping.
Alfred Roussel, 94, Canadian politician.
*Maduluwawe Sobitha Thero, 73, Sri Lankan Buddhist monk and political activist.
Dora van der Groen, 88, Belgian actress (Dokter Pulder zaait papavers).
Leon Vlok, 86, South African cricketer.

9
Selwyn Sese Ala, 29, ni-Vanuatu international footballer.
Jacqueline A. Berrien, 53, American lawyer, chairwoman of the Equal Employment Opportunity Commission (2010–2014), cancer.
Carol Doda, 78, American topless dancer, kidney failure.
Ernst Fuchs, 85, Austrian painter, co-founder of the Vienna School of Fantastic Realism.
Tommy Hanson, 29, American baseball player (Atlanta Braves, Los Angeles Angels), multiple organ failure.
Brian Keighley, 67, Scottish physician and medical unionist (BMA).
Ruth Kramer, 89, American baseball player (All-American Girls Professional Baseball League).
Byron Krieger, 95, American Olympic fencer (1952, 1956), burns.
Vito J. Lopez, 74, American politician, member of the New York State Assembly (1985–2013), cancer.
Sebastião do Rego Barros Netto, 75, Brazilian lawyer and diplomat, Ambassador to the Soviet Union (1990–1991), Russia (1991–1994) and Argentina (1999–2001), fall from building.
Remko Scha, 70, Dutch computer scientist and musician.
Yolanda Sonnabend, 80, British theatrical designer.
Andy White, 85, British drummer (The Beatles), stroke.
Mikhail Zubchuk, 47, Russian footballer (Saturn, Fakel).

10
Gene Amdahl, 92, American computer architect and high-tech entrepreneur, pneumonia.
Vernon Ashley, 99, American Crow Creek chief.
David Atlas, 91, American meteorologist, stroke.
John Carlill, 90, British rear admiral, President of Royal Naval College, Greenwich (1980–1982).
Larry Chimbole, 96, American politician, member of the California State Assembly (1974–1978).
Harold Collins, 90, Canadian politician, member of the Newfoundland and Labrador House of Assembly for Gander (1967–1979).
Robert Craft, 92, American conductor and writer.
Pat Eddery, 63, Irish jockey, eleven-time Champion Jockey, four-time Prix de l'Arc de Triomphe winner, three-time Lester Award and Epsom Derby winner, heart attack.
André Glucksmann, 78, French philosopher and writer.
Johannes Pujasumarta, 65, Indonesian Roman Catholic prelate, Archbishop of Semarang (since 2010).
Bill Quinlan, 83, American football player (Green Bay Packers).
Klaus Roth, 90, German-born British mathematician, recipient of the Fields Medal (1958).
Helmut Schmidt, 96, German politician, Chancellor of West Germany (1974–1982), complications from surgery.
Allen Toussaint, 77, American musician, producer, songwriter ("Fortune Teller", "Working in the Coal Mine", "Southern Nights") and arranger, heart attack.
Alix d'Unienville, 97, French wartime spy.
Tim Valentine, 89, American politician, member of the U.S. House of Representatives from North Carolina's 2nd district (1983–1995) and N.C. House (1955–1960), heart failure.
Laurent Vidal, 31, French Olympic triathlete (2008, 2012), heart attack.
Michael Wright, 35, American-Turkish basketball player, head injury.

11
Nancy Charton, 95, South African Anglican priest.
Madeline DeFrees, 95, American poet.
Rita Gross, 72, American Buddhist feminist theologian and author, stroke.
Bob LaLonde, 93, American politician, member of the Wyoming Senate (1989–1994).
Nathaniel Marston, 40, American actor (One Life to Live), spinal injuries from traffic collision.
Ole Sjølie, 92, Norwegian painter.
Tage Skou-Hansen, 90, Danish writer.
Scotty Stirling, 86, American journalist and sport executive (NBA, Oakland Raiders, Oakland Oaks).
Phil Taylor, 61, English drummer (Motörhead), liver failure.
Georgi Yungvald-Khilkevich, 81, Russian Soviet film director (d'Artagnan and Three Musketeers), heart failure.

12
Earl E. Anderson, 96, American Marine Corps general.
Graham Atkinson, 77, English cricketer (Lancashire, Somerset).
Lucian Bălan, 56, Romanian footballer (Baia Mare), suicide by drug overdose.
Anne-Marie Campora, 76, Monegasque politician, Mayor (1991–2003).
José Refugio Esparza Reyes, 94, Mexican politician, Governor of Aguascalientes (1974–1980).
Naila Faran, 37, Saudi doctor.
Márton Fülöp, 32, Hungarian footballer (Sunderland, national team), cancer.
Jihadi John, 27, Kuwaiti-born British Islamic State propagandist, drone strike.
Ellsworth Kalas, 92, American Methodist theologian.
Tom King, 91, American basketball player.
Marie Seznec Martinez, 57, French model, cancer.
Peter McLeavey, 79, New Zealand art dealer, Parkinson's disease.
Harry Rowen, 90, American national security expert, heart attack.
Aaron Shikler, 93, American artist, renal failure.
Jaspal Singh, 47, Indian cricketer.
Paul Stewart, 89, American historian, founder of the Black American West Museum and Heritage Center.
Pál Várhidi, 84, Hungarian football player (Újpesti Dózsa) and manager (Újpesti Dózsa, Vác, BEAC).
Travis Ward, 93, American oil magnate.

13
Sam Adams, 87, Canadian football player (BC Lions).
Abu Nabil al-Anbari, Iraqi militant, leader of ISIL in Libya, airstrike.
Giorgio Bambini, 70, Italian boxer, Olympic bronze medalist (1968).
Bruce Dayton, 97, American retail executive and philanthropist, President and Chairman of Target, founder of B. Dalton.
Glenn Goerke, 84, American academic.
John Gray, 68, New Zealand Anglican clergyman, Bishop of Te Waipounamu (1996–2015).
Betty Ann Grove, 86, American singer and actress.
Johnny Podesto, 94, American football player.
Henk Visser, 83, Dutch Olympic long jumper (1952), (1960).
Jennifer Willems, 68, Dutch actress.

14
Hemanga Baruah, 49, Indian cricketer.
Gys van Beek, 96, Dutch-born American inventor.
Nick Bockwinkel, 80, American professional wrestler (AWA).
Berugo Carámbula, 70, Uruguayan actor (Son Amores) and comedian, complications from Parkinson's disease.
Alan Davison, 79, British inorganic chemist.
K. S. Gopalakrishnan, 86, Indian film director, screenwriter and producer.
Cyril Pius MacDonald, 87, Canadian politician. 
Warren Mitchell, 89, British actor (Till Death Us Do Part, Death of a Salesman, The Price).
Hisham Nazer, 83, Saudi Arabian executive and diplomat.

15
Kai Atō, 69, Japanese actor and TV personality.
Stephen Birmingham, 86, American author, lung cancer.
LeRoy Braungardt, 76, American politician, member of the Missouri House of Representatives (1978–1985). 
Kenneth Monroe Carr, 90, American vice admiral.
Carmen Castillo, 57, Dominican baseball player (Cleveland Indians, Minnesota Twins), heart attack.
Dora Doll, 93, French actress (Manon, French Cancan, Julia).
Norm Ellenberger, 83, American college basketball coach (New Mexico Lobos).
George Genovese, 93, American baseball player (Washington Senators) and scout (San Francisco Giants).
*Guo Jie, 103, Chinese Olympic athlete (1936).
Saeed Jaffrey, 86, Indian-born British actor (The Man Who Would Be King, Shatranj Ke Khilari, My Beautiful Laundrette), brain hemorrhage.
Nicoletta Machiavelli, 71, Italian actress (Navajo Joe, The Hills Run Red, Bawdy Tales).
Vincent Margera, 59, American reality television personality (Viva La Bam, Jackass, CKY), kidney and liver failure.
Jackie McGugan, 76, Scottish footballer (St Mirren, Leeds United).
Moira Orfei, 83, Italian circus artist and actress (Scent of a Woman, Ursus, The Birds, the Bees and the Italians), stroke.
Cynthia Payne, 82, British brothel keeper.
Gisèle Prassinos, 95, French author.
Herbert Scarf, 85, American mathematician and economist, heart failure.
John P. Schlegel, 72, American Jesuit and academic administrator, President of Creighton University (2000–2011) and the University of San Francisco (1991–2000), pancreatic cancer.
P. F. Sloan, 70, American singer and songwriter ("Secret Agent Man", "Eve of Destruction", "A Must to Avoid"), pancreatic cancer.
Heinz Stickel, 66, German footballer.
Said Tarabeek, 74, Egyptian actor, heart attack.
Lauri Vaska, 90, American chemist.

16
Yuliya Balykina, 31, Belarusian Olympic sprinter (2012), homicide. (body discovered on this date)
Ronald Bandell, 69, Dutch mayor.
David Canary, 77, American actor (All My Children, Bonanza).
Louise Cowan, 98, American educator.
Richard Cowan, 57, American opera singer and festival director.
Ricardo Ferrero, 60, Argentine football player and coach.
Nando Gazzolo, 87, Italian actor and voice actor (West and Soda, The Hills Run Red, Django Shoots First).
Michael C. Gross, 70, American graphic designer and producer (Ghostbusters, Heavy Metal, Beethoven), cancer.
Jerzy Katlewicz, 88, Polish conductor and artistic director.
Wally Kincaid, 89, American Hall of Fame college baseball coach (Cerritos College).
Paul Laffoley, 80, American artist and architect, heart failure.
Seymour Lipkin, 88, American concert pianist, conductor, and educator.
Bert Olmstead, 89, Canadian Hall of Fame ice hockey player (Montreal Canadiens, Chicago Black Hawks, Toronto Maple Leafs), complications from a stroke.
Mel Ryan, 82, British cricketer (Yorkshire).
Alton D. Slay, 91, American air force general, blood cancer.
Glee S. Smith, Jr., 94, American politician, member of the Kansas Senate (1957–1973).
Soviet Song, 15, Irish-bred British-trained thoroughbred racehorse, Cartier Champion Older Horse 2004, euthanized.
David Steen, 79, British newspaper and magazine photographer.
Barbara Thiering, 85, Australian theologian, writer and Biblical revisionist (Jesus the Man).

17
Al Aarons, 83, American jazz trumpeter (Count Basie Orchestra).
Ishtiaq Ahmad, 74, Pakistani spy fiction author, heart attack.
Igwe Aja-Nwachukwu, 63, Nigerian politician, Federal Minister of Education (2007–2008).
Ed Boykin, 83, American politician.
Donald Brian, 90, New Zealand cricketer.
Guy Buckingham, 94, British engineer and automobile designer (Nota).
Mario Cervi, 94, Italian essayist and journalist, co-founder of Il Giornale.
Pino Concialdi, 69, Italian painter.
Milton Crenchaw, 96, American aviator (Tuskegee Airmen), cardiovascular disease and pneumonia.
John Gainsford, 77, South African rugby union player (Springboks), cancer.
Drago Grubelnik, 39, Slovene Olympic alpine skier (1998, 2002, 2006), traffic collision.
Sir John Leahy, 87, British diplomat, High Commissioner to Australia (1984–1988).
Rahim Moeini Kermanshahi, 89, Iranian poet.
Pithukuli Murugadas, 95, Indian devotional singer.
Olaf H. Olsen, 87, Danish historian and archaeologist.
Terence Robbins, 81, Welsh rugby union and rugby league footballer.
Laura Rockefeller Chasin, 79, American philanthropist.
Ashok Singhal, 89, Indian Hindu activist.
David VanLanding, 51, American rock singer (Michael Schenker Group, Crimson Glory), traffic collision.

18
Abdelhamid Abaaoud, 28, Belgian suspected ringleader of the November 2015 Paris attacks, shot.
Bjørn Borgen, 78, Norwegian footballer (Fredrikstad, national team).
Charles Cawley, 75, American businessman (MBNA).
Fang Jing, 44, Chinese news anchor (CCTV), cancer.
Rosetta A. Ferguson, 95, American politician.
Daniel Ferro, 94, American opera singer and vocal coach.
Wilbur Foss, 94, American politician and musician.
Dan Halldorson, 63, Canadian golfer, stroke.
Redvers Kyle, 86, South African-British television continuity announcer, voice-over artist and actor.
Jonah Lomu, 40, New Zealand rugby union player (All Blacks), heart attack.
Mack McCormick, 85, American musicologist and folklorist, esophageal cancer.
Lindela Ndlovu, Zimbabwean educator, Vice-Chancellor of National University of Science and Technology.
Norman C. Pickering, 99, American engineer and inventor.
James Prideaux, 88, American playwright and screenwriter, stroke.
Harold Searles, 97, American psychiatrist.
Jim Slater, 86, British financier.
André Valmy, 96, French actor.

19
Armand, 69, Dutch protest singer, pneumonia.
Ricardo de la Cierva, 89, Spanish historian and politician, Culture Minister (1980) and Senator by Murcia (1977–1979).
Rex Cunningham, 91, New Zealand rugby league player.
Sir Naim Dangoor, 101, Iraqi-born British businessman and philanthropist.
Ann Downer, 54, American writer, amyotrophic lateral sclerosis.
Allen E. Ertel, 78, American politician, member of the U.S. House of Representatives from Pennsylvania's 17th district (1977–1983).
James Evans, 52, American football player (Kansas City Chiefs, Tampa Bay Buccaneers).
John Hall-Jones, 88, New Zealand historian.
János Herbst, 59, Hungarian footballer and politician, MP (1998–2002).
Ron Hynes, 64, Canadian folksinger ("Sonny's Dream"), throat cancer.
John A. Knauss, 90, American oceanographer.
Korrie Layun Rampan, 62, Indonesian author and politician.
Rex Reason, 86, German-born American actor (This Island Earth, The Creature Walks Among Us, The Roaring 20's).
Jim Stump, 83, American baseball player (Detroit Tigers).
R. K. Trivedi, 94, Indian politician, Governor of Gujarat (1986–1990).
Herman Wecke, 88, American soccer player.
Mal Whitfield, 91, American middle-distance runner, Olympic champion (1948, 1952) and aviator (Tuskegee Airmen).
John Eugene Zuccotti, 78, American businessman, namesake of Zuccotti Park.

20
Peter Dimmock, 94, British broadcaster (Sportsview).
Vlatko Dulić, 72, Croatian actor and theatre director.
Miroslav Fiedler, 89, Czech mathematician.
Ronald Frankenberg, 86, British anthropologist.
Néstor Isella, 78, Argentine football player and coach.
Lex Jacoby, 85, Luxembourgian writer.
Austin H. Kiplinger, 97, American journalist.
Svetlana Kitova, 55, Russian middle-distance runner.
Agustin Mantilla, 70, Peruvian economist and politician.
Keith Michell, 88, Australian actor (The Six Wives of Henry VIII, Henry VIII and His Six Wives, Murder, She Wrote) and director.
Jan Monrad, 64, Danish comedian and entertainer, blood clot.
Nguyen-Thien Dao, 75, Vietnamese-French composer.
Carlos Oroza, 92, Spanish poet.
Richard Owen, 92, American federal judge and composer.
Jim Perry, 82, American television emcee (Definition, Card Sharks, $ale of the Century), cancer.
Héctor Salva, 75, Uruguayan international footballer.
Nancy Sandars, 101, British archaeologist.
Kitanoumi Toshimitsu, 62, Japanese sumo wrestler, chairman of the Japan Sumo Association (2002–2008, since 2012), multiple organ failure.
Raymond van Schoor, 25, Namibian cricketer, stroke.

21
Gregory H. Adamian, 89, American academic.
Gil Cardinal, 65, Canadian filmmaker, cirrhosis.
Kerry Dineen, 63, American baseball player (New York Yankees), cancer.
Ameen Faheem, 76, Indian-born Pakistani politician, Commerce Minister (2008–2013) and poet, leukaemia.
Fan Xuji, 101, Chinese academic.
Bob Foster, 77, American boxer, world light heavyweight champion (1968–1974).
Linda Haglund, 59, Swedish Olympic sprinter (1972, 1976, 1980), cancer and pulmonary hemorrhage.
Adele Horin, 64, Australian writer and journalist, lung cancer.
Ken Johnson, 82, American baseball player (Atlanta Braves, Houston Astros).
*Paku Alam IX, 77, Indonesian prince and politician.
Tayva Patch, 62, American actress in Mormon cinema, complications from surgery.
Cavit Şadi Pehlivanoğlu, 88, Turkish politician, member of the Grand National Assembly of Turkey (1961–1996), complications from pneumonia.
Anthony Read, 80, British screenwriter (Doctor Who).
*Red Cadeaux, 9, British-bred Australian racehorse, three-time runner-up in the Melbourne Cup, euthanized after race injury.
Germán Robles, 86, Spanish-Mexican actor.
Richard Russell, 91, American finance writer.
Joseph Silverstein, 83, American violinist and conductor, heart attack.
Zoran Ubavič, 50, Slovenian footballer.

22
Hazel Adair, 95, British television writer (Crossroads, Compact, Emergency – Ward 10).
Abubakar Audu, 68, Nigerian politician, Governor of Kogi State (1992–1993, 1999–2003), heart attack.
Henson P. Barnes, 81, American politician, member of the North Carolina Senate (1977–1992).
Salahuddin Quader Chowdhury, 66, Bangladeshi politician and convicted war criminal, execution by hanging.
Howard E. Greer, 94, American vice admiral.
Jerzy Karasiński, 73, Polish footballer (Lech Poznań).
*Kim Young-sam, 87, South Korean politician, President (1993–1998), heart failure.
Sipke van der Land, 78, Dutch presenter (NCRV).
Weslyn Mather, 70, Canadian politician, Alberta MLA for Edmonton-Mill Woods (2004–2008), skin infection.
Valentin Mogilny, 49, Ukrainian Soviet gymnast, heart attack.
Ali Ahsan Mohammad Mojaheed, 67, Bangladeshi politician and convicted war criminal, execution by hanging.
Adele Morales, 90, American painter, pneumonia.
Nola, 41, Sudanese-born American and last surviving female northern white rhinoceros, euthanized.
Albert Pick, 93, German numismatist.
Alfredo Prucker, 89, Italian Olympic Nordic skier, (1948), (1952), (1956).
Ingeborg Sjöqvist, 103, Swedish Olympic diver (1932, 1936).
Robin Stewart, 69, British actor (Bless This House, Cromwell, The Legend of the 7 Golden Vampires).
André Waignein, 73, Belgian composer.

23
Jamiluddin Aali, 90, Pakistani Urdu poet.
Topazia Alliata, 102, Italian painter and writer.
Pierre Bernard, 73, French graphic artist and designer.
Manmeet Bhullar, 35, Canadian politician, Alberta MLA (Calgary-Greenway) and cabinet minister, traffic collision.
Jerzy Browkin, 81, Polish mathematician.
Dan Fante, 71, American author and playwright.
Hazel Holt, 87, British novelist.
Steve Hrymnak, 89, Canadian ice hockey player (Chicago Black Hawks).
Kâmran İnan, 86, Turkish politician.
Jouni Kaipainen, 58, Finnish composer.
Alex Kersey-Brown, 73, Welsh rugby player, cancer.
Chuck Lamson, 76, American football player (Los Angeles Rams, Minnesota Vikings).
Beatriz Lockhart, 71, Uruguayan pianist and composer.
Antônio Lomanto Júnior, 90, Brazilian politician, Governor of Bahia (1963–1967).
Sam Mardian, 96, American politician, Mayor of Phoenix (1960–1964).
Douglass North, 95, American economist and laureate of the Nobel Memorial Prize in Economic Sciences (1993), esophageal cancer.
Lev Okun, 86, Russian theoretical physicist.
Juan Quarterone, 80, Argentine football player and coach.
Kaladevanhalli Ramprasad, 81, Indian cricketer.
Cynthia Robinson, 71, American trumpeter and vocalist (Sly and the Family Stone), cancer.
Willie Royster, 61, American baseball player (Baltimore Orioles).
Otto Schaden, 78, American Egyptologist.
Jim Sochor, 77, American football player and coach (UC Davis), cancer.
Ankie Stork, 94, Dutch World War II resistance fighter.
Yoram Tsafrir, 77, Israeli archaeologist.

24
Sir Robert Ford, 91, British army general Adjutant-General to the Forces (1978–1981).
John Forrester, 66, British historian and philosopher of science, cancer.
Pierre Gabriel, 82, French mathematician (Gabriel's theorem).
Zdeněk Humhal, 81, Czech volleyball player, Olympic silver medalist (1964).
Jack C. Inman, 90, American politician.
Al Markim, 88, American actor (Tom Corbett, Space Cadet).
Quincy Monk, 36, American football player (New York Giants, Houston Texans), cancer.
Marium Mukhtiar, 23, Pakistani fighter pilot, plane crash.
Heinz Oberhummer, 74, Austrian physicist.
A. S. Ponnammal, 89, Indian politician, cancer.
Aubrey Sheiham, 79, South African-born British dental epidemiologist.
Douglas W. Shorenstein, 60, American real estate developer, chairman of the board of the Federal Reserve Bank of San Francisco, cancer.
Bobby Smith, 81, American baseball player (St. Louis Cardinals, Philadelphia Phillies, New York Mets).
Niel Tupas Sr., 82, Filipino politician, prostate cancer and heart failure.
Varduhi Varderesyan, 87, Romanian-born Armenian actress.
Aurora Venturini, 92, Argentine author.
Steven Vogel, 75, American biologist, cancer.
Steve Wildstrom, 68, American technology journalist (BusinessWeek), brain cancer.
Mieko Yagi, 65, Japanese Olympic equestrian.

25
O'Neil Bell, 40, Jamaican cruiserweight boxer, undisputed world champion (2006), shot.
Sir Jeremy Black, 83, British admiral.
Kerry Casey, 61, Australian actor, writer and director (George of the Jungle 2, Mighty Morphin' Power Rangers: The Movie), cancer.
Svein Christiansen, 74, Norwegian jazz drummer.
Gloria Contreras Roeniger, 81, Mexican dancer and choreographer.
Jean Corti, 86, French accordionist.
Judith Fitzgerald, 63, Canadian poet. 
Eva Fuka, 88, Czech-born American photographer.
Lennart Hellsing, 96, Swedish author and translator.
Pierre-Yvon Lenoir, 79, French Olympic middle-distance runner (1960).
Chris Martin, 42, British civil servant, Principal Private Secretary to the Prime Minister (since 2012), cancer.
Beth Rogan, 84, British actress (Mysterious Island).
Inuwa Wada, 98, Nigerian politician.
Elmo Williams, 102, American editor and producer (High Noon, The Longest Day, Tora! Tora! Tora!), Oscar winner (1953).
Ken Woolley, 82, Australian architect.

26
Amir Aczel, 65, Israeli-born American mathematician and scientist, cancer.
Ronnie Bright, 77, American bass singer (The Cadillacs, The Coasters, The Valentines).
Jorgo Bulo, 76, Albanian philologist and historian.
Eldzier Cortor, 99, American artist.
Eddy De Leeuw, 59, Belgian Olympic sprinter.
Tom Dublinski, 85, American football player (Toronto Argonauts, Detroit Lions, Hamilton Tiger-Cats).
Norbert Gastell, 86, German actor and voice actor (Homer Simpson).
Tommy Gilbert, 75, American professional wrestler (CWA/USWA) and referee (UWF).
Noboru Karashima, 82, Japanese historian.
Jerrold Kemp, 94, American academic.
Del Kennedy, 92, Australian football player (Footscray).
Guy Lewis, 93, American Hall of Fame college basketball coach (Houston Cougars).
Tom Moss, 87, American politician, Speaker (1991–2000) and member of the Virginia House of Delegates (1966–2002), heart attack.
Larry Powers, 76, American bodybuilder and actor (Me, Natalie).
George Pyne III, 74, American football player (Boston Patriots), cancer.
Jovan Šarčević, 49, Serbian footballer (FK Proleter Zrenjanin).
Sumiko Shirakawa, 80, Japanese voice actress (Doraemon, Sazae-san, Space Dandy), subarachnoid hemorrhage.
Bill Stauffer, 85, American basketball player (Missouri Tigers), brain hemorrhage.
David Steinmetz, 79, American historian.
Bill Tucker, 73, American football player (San Francisco 49ers, Chicago Bears), heart attack.
H. Khekiho Zhimomi, 69, Indian politician, heart ailment.

27
Humza Al-Hafeez, 84, American police officer and activist.
Ragnhild Barland, 81, Norwegian politician, member of Parliament (1985–1997).
Mark Behr, 52, Tanzanian-born South African author (The Smell of Apples).
José Benedito Simão, 64, Brazilian Roman Catholic prelate, Bishop of Assis (since 2009).
Ian Dargie, 84, English footballer (Brentford).
Luca De Filippo, 67, Italian actor and theatre director.
Esperanza Guisán, 75, Spanish philosopher.
Barbro Hiort af Ornäs, 94, Swedish actress (Brink of Life, The Touch, Shame).
V. Krishnaprasad, 69, Indian cricketer.
Alexander Kukarin, 22, Russian modern pentathlete, heart attack.
Lou Marone, 69, American baseball player (Pittsburgh Pirates).
Mukund Sathe, 78, Indian cricketer.
Maurice Strong, 86, Canadian businessman and diplomat.
Garrett Swasey, 44, American police officer and junior ice dancing champion (1992), shot.
J. Randolph Tucker, Jr., 101, American politician and judge.
Xosé Neira Vilas, 87, Spanish author.
Philippe Washer, 91, Belgian tennis player.

28
Mircea Anca, 55, Romanian actor and director, leukemia.
Aurèle Audet, 95, Canadian politician.
Yoka Berretty, 87, Dutch actress (Makkers Staakt uw Wild Geraas, The Silent Raid, Punk Lawyer).
Luc Bondy, 67, Swiss theater and opera director.
Gerry Byrne, 77, English footballer (Liverpool, national team), World Cup Champion (1966), Alzheimer's disease.
Marion Crecco, 85, American politician, member of the New Jersey General Assembly (1986–2002).
Tahir Elçi, 49, Turkish pro-Kurdish lawyer, shot.
Federico O. Escaler, 93, Filipino Roman Catholic prelate, Prelate of Kidapawan (1976–1980) and Ipil (1980–1997).
Ivan Hlevnjak, 71, Croatian Yugoslav footballer.
Jean Joubert, 87, French author.
Doug Lennox, 77, Canadian actor (X-Men, Police Academy) and writer.
Lin Rong-San, 76, Taiwanese billionaire politician, publisher and businessman, cardiopulmonary failure.
Marjorie Lord, 97, American film and television actress (The Danny Thomas Show).
Nauro Machado, 80, Brazilian poet.
José María Mendiluce, 64, Spanish politician and author.
Janez Strnad, 81, Slovene physicist.
Tomasz Tomczykiewicz, 54, Polish politician, member of Sejm (2001–2015), chronic kidney disease.
Olene Walker, 85, American politician, Governor (2003–2005) and Lieutenant Governor of Utah (1993–2003).

29
Claire Aho, 90, Finnish photographer, fire.
Wayne Bickerton, 74, British songwriter ("Nothing but a Heartache", "Sugar Baby Love"), record producer, and music executive.
Ramón de los Santos, 66, Dominican baseball player (Houston Astros).
John Demarie, 70, American football player (Cleveland Browns).
Ottó Dóra, 53, Hungarian politician, Mayor of Salgótarján (since 2014).
Joseph F. Girzone, 85, American Catholic priest and author.
George Hadjinikos, 92, Greek musician.
Jonathan Janson, 85, British Olympic sailor.
Vasyl Lishchynskyi, 51, Ukrainian Paralympic athlete.
Tunku Abdul Malik, 86, Malaysian royal.
Joe Marston, 89, Australian soccer player (Preston North End) and manager (national team).
Joachim Carlos Martini, 84, Chilean-born German conductor (Junge Kantorei).
Christopher Middleton, 89, British poet and translator.
Buddy Moreno, 103, American musician and radio and television personality.
Otto Newman, 93, Austrian-born British sociologist.
Oʻtkir Sultonov, 76, Uzbek politician, Prime Minister (1995–2003).

30
Meli Bainimarama, 70, Fijian businessman and permanent secretary.
Pío Caro Baroja, 87, Spanish director and writer.
Jack Brizendine, 71, American horse trainer, lung cancer.
Nigel Buxton, 91, British travel writer.
André Carbonnelle, 92, Belgian Olympic hockey player.
Charles Shipley Cox, 93, American oceanographic physicist.
Jean Deplace, 71, French cellist.
Bob Dustal, 80, American baseball player (Detroit Tigers).
Jack Fagan, 82, New Zealand rugby league player.
Greg Fisk, 70, American politician, Mayor of Juneau, Alaska (2015).
Minas Hatzisavvas, 67, Greek actor.
Gerrit Holdijk, 71, Dutch politician, Senator (1986–1987, 1991–2015), lung cancer.
Sabri Khan, 88, Indian sarangi player.
Marcus Klingberg, 97, Polish-born Israeli scientist and spy for the Soviet Union.
Brajraj Mahapatra, 94, Indian monarch, Raja of Tigiria State (1943–1947).
Fatema Mernissi, 75, Moroccan feminist writer and sociologist.
Shigeru Mizuki, 93, Japanese manga artist (GeGeGe no Kitarō, Onward Towards Our Noble Deaths, Showa: A History of Japan), heart attack.
Adolph Plummer, 77, American sprinter.
Eldar Ryazanov, 88, Russian film director (Carnival Night, The Irony of Fate, Promised Heaven), respiratory and heart failure.
Steve Shagan, 88, American novelist, screenwriter, and producer (Save the Tiger, Voyage of the Damned, Primal Fear).
David Simmons, 85, New Zealand ethnologist and historian.
Renzo Trivelli, 90, Italian politician.
Leslie Waddington, 81, British art dealer.

References

2015-11
 11